Lady Buckit and the Motley Mopsters also simply known as LBMM is a 2020 Nigerian computer-animated fantasy film directed by Adebisi Adetayo from a story by Stanlee Ohikhuare and a screenplay by Ayo Arigbabu. The film stars Bimbo Akintola, Patrick Doyle, Bola Edwards and Kalu Ikeagwu in the lead roles. The film is also the first Nigerian cinematic feature-length animated film. The film production underwent several delays since 2017, But later had its exclusive special screening at the Genesis Cinemas in Lekki, Lagos on 5 December 2020. It had its theatrical release on 11 December 2020 and opened to mixed reviews from critics.

Cast 

 Bimbo Akintola
 Patrick Doyle
 Bola Edwards
 Kalu Ikeagwu
 Simi Hassan
 Francis Sule
 Casey Edema
 Awazi Angbalaga

Synopsis 
The plot revolves around a precious young little girl called Bukky who loves to assist her father enthusiastically to solve arithmetic and logic easily get into the nerves of her mother.

Production 
The production of the film was initially supposed to begin by 2017 but had been stalled at numerous occasions due to financial issues and lack of cohesion from initial production team. A film project titled SADE which was originally taunted to be the first Nigerian animated film was eventually shelved in 2018 due to financial tussles.

The film finally began its principal photography in November 2019 under Blessing's own production house Hot Ticket Productions. Around 30 cast and crew members were roped in for the film shooting. 11 year old Jessica Edwards, 13 year old David Edwards and array of eight lead cast and six supporting cast who were part of those auditioned and cast were also roped in as dubbing artists/voice actors to lend voice. However the film underwent further delays and derailment due to the COVID-19 pandemic in Nigeria and the resulting lockdowns in Lagos. The portions of the film's were mostly shot in Lagos amid regular power cuts. The film was shot as 3D animation with 4K resolution, at 24 frames per second for each cinematic effect. The film budget was estimated around ₦400 million.

Soundtrack 
A collection of 14 track original album and individual tracks were composed by Oluchi Odii, Patrick Edwards, Marilyn Mayaki, Ufuoma Iliaro, Casey Edema, Caleb Audu, DJ Klem and Ava Momoh.

Awards and nominations

References 

Nigerian animated films
Yoruba-language films
2020 computer-animated films
Films shot in Lagos